John Jensen was an American costume designer who was nominated for two Academy Awards.

Oscar Nominations
Both were for Best Costumes.

29th Academy Awards (color costumes category): Nominated for The Ten Commandments. Nomination shared with Arnold Friberg, Edith Head, Dorothy Jeakins and Ralph Jester. Lost to The King and I.
31st Academy Awards: Nominated for The Buccaneer. Nomination shared with Edith Head and Ralph Jester. Lost to Gigi.

Filmography
The Ten Commandments (1956)
The Buccaneer (1958)
The Bellboy (1960)
Where It's At (1969)
The Cowboys (1972)

References

External links

American costume designers

Possibly living people
Year of birth missing
Place of birth missing